Saawan Ke Geet (Monsoon Songs) is a 1978 Bollywood drama film, directed by R. Bhattacharya. The film's music was composed by the duo Laxmikant–Pyarelal, with lyrics by Majrooh Sultanpuri.

Cast
Sanjeev Kumar as Kishan
Rekha as Radha
Aruna Irani as Bijli
Mehmood as Chanda Ustad
Amjad Khan
Satyendra Kapoor  
Jagdeep
Joginder
Bhagwan Dada
Om Shivpuri

Music
"Ho Gaya Re Ye Sawan Bairi" - Kishore Kumar
"Tum Se Mil Ke Dilbar Yaar Hum To Lut Gaye Beech Bazar" - Lata Mangeshkar, Kishore Kumar
"Daudo Kanhai Mera Mara Mai Bechara" - Manna Dey
"O Mera Pallu Kahe Khiche" - Lata Mangeshkar

References

External links
 

1978 films
1970s Hindi-language films
1978 drama films
Films scored by Laxmikant–Pyarelal
Indian drama films
Hindi-language drama films